Louise Elizabeth Garden–MacLeod (1857–1944) English-born American artist and arts educator. In 1887, she co-founded the Los Angeles School of Art and Design with Mrs. J. Dalton Bond, this was the first art school in the area.

History 
Louise Elizabeth Garden was born in London, England, on 25 April 1857. She began studying art at a young age and by the time she was a teenager she attended London's Royal School of Art in South Kensington. It was at the Royal School of Art she studying under N. G. Green, an instructor to the British royal family, as well as a pupil of George Lesile, Henry Fiske, Richard Eschke, and Leandro Ramón Garrido. She also studied at Whistler's School (also known as Académie Carmen) in Paris, France.

In 1887, she moved from London to Los Angeles, California in hopes that the milder weather would improve her health. That same year, co-founded the Los Angeles School of Art and Design with Mrs. J. Dalton Bond, this was the first art school in the area.

In 1890, she wed Malcolm MacLeod, a Scottish inventor who helped her with running the art school. They were married until MacLeod's death in 1914.

References 

1857 births
1944 deaths
American people of British descent
Artists from Los Angeles
Artists from London
20th-century American painters
Académie Carmen alumni